State Highway 11 (SH 11) is a  long north–south state highway in the U.S. state of Colorado. It runs from U.S. Highway 138 (US 138) and US 385 in Julesburg to the Nebraska state line.

Route description
SH 11 begins at an intersection with US 138-385 at the west city limits of Julesburg and proceeds almost directly north to the state line. The road is county-maintained in Nebraska, but becomes Nebraska Highway 27 upon intersecting Interstate 80 (at exit 95). SH 11 thus provides the shortest connection from I-80 to Julesburg, which appears on signs for exit 95.

History
The roadway that SH 11 follows was first added to the state highway system in 1932-1934 as a northerly extension of State Highway 51 (now US 385 south of Julesburg). The state eliminated many state highways in 1953, including this extension of SH 51 north of Julesburg. In 1970-1971 the road was returned to the state highway system as SH 11.

Major intersections

References

External links

 Colorado Highways: Route 11

Transportation in Sedgwick County, Colorado
011